William Elmer (April 25, 1869 – February 24, 1945) was an American actor of the silent era. He appeared in more than 80 films between 1913 and 1942. He was born in Council Bluffs, Iowa and died in Hollywood, California. Elmer acted in stock theater in addition to his work in films.

Selected filmography

 The Left-Handed Man (1913, Short) - Policeman
 The Squaw Man (1914) - Cash Hawkins
 The Master Mind (1914) - Cash Hawkins
 Brewster's Millions (1914) - 1st Prizefighter
 Shotgun Jones (1914, Short) - Hays
 The Master Mind (1914) - Creegan
 The Man on the Box (1914) - Troop Commander
 The Virginian (1914) - Trampas
 Ready Money (1914) - Jim Dolan
 Rose of the Rancho (1914) - Half Breed
 The Circus Man (1914) - Isaac Perry
 The Ghost Breaker (1914) - Robledo
 The Girl of the Golden West (1915) - Ashby
 A Gentleman of Leisure (1915) - Spike Mullins
 The Unafraid (1915, Short) - Jack McCarty
 The Captive (1915) - Turkish Officer
 The Arab (1915) - Meshur
 The Clue (1915) - Detective Williams
 Kindling (1915) - Rafferty
 The Fighting Hope (1915) - Detective Fletcher
 Carmen (1915) - Morales
 The Golden Chance (1915) - The Rent Collector
 The Ragamuffin (1916) - Kelly
 The Blacklist (1916) - King
 A Gutter Magdalene (1916) - Halpin
 The Selfish Woman (1916) - Jim
 The Honorable Friend (1916) - Murphy
 The Plow Girl (1916) - Kregler
 Joan the Woman (1916) - Guy Townes
 The Winning of Sally Temple (1917) - Tom Jellitt
 Castles for Two (1917) - Callahan
 The Prison Without Walls (1917) - Horse Gilligan
 The Girl at Home (1917) - Detective Hagen
 Freckles (1917) - Black Jack
 Her Strange Wedding (1917) - Peters
 The Countess Charming (1917) - Detective Boyle
 The Sunset Trail (1917) - Price Lovel
 His Mother's Boy (1917) - Banty Jones
 Wolves of the Rail (1918) - Pablo Trilles
 The Widow's Might (1918) - Minor Role
 The Things We Love (1918) - Kenwood's Agent
 The Family Skeleton (1918) - 'Spider' Doyle
 Playing the Game (1918) - Hodges
 The Bravest Way (1918)
 We Can't Have Everything (1918) - Props
 The Firefly of France (1918) - Aide to Von Blenheim
 A Burglar for a Night (1918) - William Neal
 Coals of Fire (1918) - Ben Roach
 He Comes Up Smiling (1918)
 The Way of a Man with a Maid (1918) - Bill
 The Dub (1919) - Burglar Bill
 Maggie Pepper (1919) - Dud Corey
 Alias Mike Moran (1919) - Tick Flynn
 Married in Haste (1919) - Chauffeur
 The Usurper (1919) - Bob Quentin
 Cheating Herself (1919) - Dugan
 Pinto (1920) - Lousy
 Leave It to Me (1920) - Red Kelly
 Forbidden Trails (1920) - Davis
 Uncharted Channels (1920) - Jim Baker
 Prairie Trails (1920) - Rod Blake
 The Road Demon (1921)
 The Big Town Round-Up (1921) - Jerry Casey
 Big Game (1921)
 The Foolish Age (1921) - Cauliflower Jim
 Two Kinds of Women (1922) - Poker Face
 Man with Two Mothers (1922) - Clancy
 Iron to Gold (1922) - Bat Piper
 The Bootlegger's Daughter (1922) - Ben Roach
 Pawned (1922) - Joe Burke
 In Search of a Thrill (1923) - Percy (the valet)
 The Whipping Boss (1924) - Spike
 The Night Hawk (1924)
 Battling Mason (1924) - (uncredited)
 Condemned (1929) - Pierre
 Cimarron (1931) - (uncredited)
 Les Misérables (1935) - Lawyer (uncredited)
 Kitty Foyle (1940) - Neway (uncredited)
 The Devil and Miss Jones (1941) - Attendant at Jim's Bath House (uncredited)
 Reap the Wild Wind (1942) - Juror (uncredited)
 The Magnificent Ambersons (1942) - Servant (uncredited)

References

External links

1869 births
1945 deaths
American male film actors
American male silent film actors
20th-century American male actors
Male actors from Iowa